The Zone is a 2011 American drama film written, produced, and edited by Joe Swanberg.  It stars Sophia Takal, Lawrence Michael Levine, Kate Lyn Sheil, Kentucker Audley, Swanberg, Adam Wingard, Kris Swanberg, and Dustin Guy Defa.  Swanberg and several of his regulars play themselves in a film within a film.

Premise 
Joe Swanberg directs Kentucker, Sophia, Larry, and Kate in a film within a film about a mysterious man who seduces a trio of residents of an apartment.  The sexually explicit scenes put a strain on his relationships with the actors, and Swanberg expresses doubt in his ability to fulfill his artistic vision.

Cast 
 Sophia Takal as Sophia
 Lawrence Michael Levine as Larry
 Kate Lyn Sheil as Kate
 Kentucker Audley
 Joe Swanberg
 Adam Wingard
 Kris Swanberg
 Dustin Guy Defa

Release 
The Zone premiered at the 2011 AFI Fest.

Reception 
Andrew Barker of Variety wrote, "But though this film mostly finds the helmer exploring ever-deeper recesses of his own navel, its moments of genuine insight and knack for pulling out the rug upend some of its faults."  Justin Lowe of The Hollywood Reporter wrote, "Less is less in another middling mumblecore outing."  Richard Brody of The New Yorker called it "a movie of terrible elegiac power".

References

External links 
 

2011 films
2011 drama films
American drama films
2010s English-language films
Films directed by Joe Swanberg
Mumblecore films
Films about actors
Films about filmmaking
2010s American films